Chiara Tiddi (born 16 December 1988) is an Italian field hockey player.

Tiddi is the current captain of the Italian national team, and made her senior international debut in 2012.

References

1988 births
Living people
Italian female field hockey players
Female field hockey defenders
Expatriate field hockey players
Italian expatriate sportspeople in Belgium
KHC Dragons players